Bepoase is a community in the Sekyere South District in the Ashanti Region of Ghana. It is located about 60 km north east of Kumasi. The residents are mostly farmers and kente weavers.

Institutions 
 Bepoase Islamic Primary School
 Bepoase Methodist School
 Bepoase Clinic

References 

Ashanti Region
Communities in Ghana